Jacques Élie Pascal Brunet  (10 May 1901 — 15 December 1990) was a French top civil servant and banker.

Biography 
A law graduate and a graduate of the Free School of Political Science, he entered the Inspection des finances in 1924.

Finance Inspector and State Councilor (in extraordinary service), he was appointed Treasury Director when this position was created in 1940 until in 1946. He became Inspector General of Finance in 1945 and Government Commissioner before the Council of State.

He was managing director of the Banque de l'Algérie from 1946 to 1949, chairman and managing director of the Crédit national from 1949 to 1960, chairman of the Caisse Nationale des Marchés de l'Etat, the Caisse Marocaine des Marchés, the Caisse Nationale de l'Energie, then was appointed Governor of the Banque de France from January 21, 1960, replacing .

, succeeded him as head of the Banque de France on 8 April 1969.

References

Sources 
 Historical Dictionary of Finance Inspectors 1801-2009, Institute of Public Management and Economic Development, 2012

1901 births
1990 deaths
French bankers
People from Paris
Sciences Po alumni
Inspection générale des finances (France)